Punkrock.net was a website that existed from 1996-2001 as a resource for the punk community. The site was created by Josh Grubman, Sarah Herritage, and Nikki Levine. Originally beginning as a user-submitted database for the DIY traveller and touring punk band, it later morphed into a major online community for punks worldwide to communicate with one another and share ideas. 

Punkrock.net drew its userbase primarily from the dying EFnet IRC #sxe and #punk, the Chainsaw Records messageboard, and the newsgroup alt.music.hardcore. Members of the dead SXE-L listserv were also key players of the site. The users all had the same basic underlying interest - punk and hardcore punk music. 

The original administrators of the site shut the messageboard down in 2001 after reported "disillusionment" with internet punk communities.

References
 Punkrock.net calls it quits after 7 years
 Punkrock.net embraces Sissyfight
Internet properties established in 1996
Defunct websites
Internet properties disestablished in 2001